Rogelio Lazo Singson is a Filipino industrial engineer, businessman, and public servant. He served in the cabinet of President Benigno Aquino III as Secretary of Public Works and Highways (DPWH) from 2010 to 2016.

Early life
Before joining the Cabinet of President Aquino, he served in various senior positions such as Senior Vice President for Business Development, Citadel Holdings, Inc. from July 2002 to May 2007; Chairman & President of Bases Conversion and Development Authority from July 1998-February 2002; and concurrent Chairman of the Board of John Hay Poro Point Development Corporation, BCDA Management Holdings Inc., and North Luzon Railways Corporation from July 1998 to February 2002.

As Senior Vice President for Project Development of Citadel Holdings, Inc., he was responsible for identifying and developing new business ventures and expansion of core business of the Holdings Group.  During that time, he led the consortium with foreign investors and technical partners that participated in two (2) biddings of electricity transmission company Transco, and the successful acquisition of a telecommunications project in Micronesia.

As former Chairman and President of BCDA, the public-private partnership projects he pushed include the conversion of former military baselands (Clark, Subic, John Hay, Poro Point, Fort Bonifacio (Bonifacio Global City), & Villamor bases) from military use to private commercial and industrial uses as special economic and freeport zones.   He was responsible for conceptualizing and promoting Subic Clark Alliance Development (SCAD) Project as a national priority program and in securing JBIC loan and funding arrangements for Subic Clark Tarlac Toll Road.  He is credited for the successful bidding of major portions of Fort Bonifacio paving the way for the entry of big developers including the Fort Bonifacio Development, Market-Market, Pacific Plaza Towers, and for concluding agreements with International School, Japanese School and British School to enhance the total development of Fort Bonifacio.

He also served as Director of Metro Pacific Investments Corporation, Clark Development Corporation, Clark International Airport Corporation, Fort Bonifacio Development Corporation; and board membership at Subic Bay Metropolitan Authority, National Power Corporation, and Metropolitan Waterworks & Sewerage System.

Background
Before being appointed by Benigno Aquino III to the Public Works and Highways secretary post, Singson was the incumbent president and Chief Executive Officer of Maynilad after its reprivatization from July 1, 2007 to June 30, 2010.

References

 

1948 births
Living people
Secretaries of Public Works and Highways of the Philippines
People from Vigan
Filipino Roman Catholics
Benigno Aquino III administration cabinet members